Phasianema phycophyllum is a species of sea snail, a marine gastropod mollusk in the family Pyramidellidae, the pyrams and their allies.

Habitat
This species is found in the following habitats:
 brackish
 marine

References

External links
 To World Register of Marine Species

Pyramidellidae
Gastropods described in 1967